Malachy Conlon (died 27 March 1950) was a nationalist politician in Ireland.

Conlon strongly believed that there was a need for a membership organisation linking nationalists in Northern Ireland.  He pursued this theme during his campaign for the Nationalist Party in South Armagh at the 1945 Northern Ireland general election.  During the campaign, which he fought against a Northern Ireland Labour Party incumbent, he stressed the importance of Christianity to Irish identity and contrasted this with what he described as the "flag of the communist Jew".

Following his election, Conlon worked with Eddie McAteer to found the Irish Anti-Partition League in November 1945, and was appointed its full-time Secretary.

References

Year of birth missing
1950 deaths
Members of the House of Commons of Northern Ireland 1945–1949
Members of the House of Commons of Northern Ireland 1949–1953
Nationalist Party (Ireland) members of the House of Commons of Northern Ireland
Members of the House of Commons of Northern Ireland for County Armagh constituencies